Iisalmi Airfield is an airfield in Iisalmi, Finland, about  north-northwest of Iisalmi town centre, in Partala village.

See also
List of airports in Finland

References

External links
 VFR Suomi/Finland – Iisalmi Airfield
 Lentopaikat.net – Iisalmi Airfield 

Airports in Finland
Airfield
Buildings and structures in North Savo